The olive-grey saltator (Saltator olivascens) is a passerine bird in the tanager family Thraupidae. It was formerly considered conspecific with the greyish saltator (Saltator coerulescens), but was split as a distinct species by the IOC in 2021. It is found in Colombia, Venezuela, and Trinidad.

References

Olive-grey saltator
Birds of Colombia
Birds of Venezuela
Birds of Trinidad and Tobago
Olive-grey saltator
Taxa named by Jean Cabanis